Çomaklı can refer to:

 Çomaklı, Çan
 Çomaklı, Korkuteli